The All-Ireland Senior Hardball Singles title is an all-Ireland Gaelic Athletic Association competition between all 32 counties of Ireland which first commenced in 1925. The first senior hardball singles title was won by W. Aldridge. The current All-Ireland Senior Hardball champion is Robbie McCarthy, who represents Westmeath and Mullingar Handball Club.

Top winners

Previous winners

See also
 Gaelic handball
 Gaelic Senior Softball Singles

External links
Handball Roll of Honour
Official GAA Handball Website

Gaelic Athletic Association competitions
Gaelic handball